Muyumba is a surname. Notable people with the surname include:

Francine Muyumba (born 1987), Congolese activist and politician
Tristan Muyumba (born 1997), French-Congolese footballer

Surnames of African origin